Henry Cecil Raikes PC (18 November 1838 – 24 August 1891) was a British Conservative Party politician. He was Chairman of Ways and Means between 1874 and 1880 and served as Postmaster General between 1886 and 1891.

Background and education
Born in Chester, Cheshire, Raikes was the grandson of Reverend Henry Raikes, Chancellor of the Diocese of Chester, and the great-grandson of Thomas Raikes, a merchant and banker in London, who was Governor of the Bank of England and a personal friend of prime minister William Pitt the Younger. He was educated at Shrewsbury School and Trinity College, Cambridge.

Political career
Raikes was Member of Parliament for Chester between 1868 and 1880, for Preston in 1882 and for Cambridge University between 1882 and 1891. He served as Chairman of the National Union of Conservative and Constitutional Associations from 1869 to 1874. In 1874 he was appointed Chairman of Ways and Means (Deputy Speaker of the House of Commons), a post he held until 1880, when he was sworn of the Privy Council. He later returned to party political life when he served as Postmaster General under Lord Salisbury between 1886 and 1891.

Raikes is one of the earliest British politicians to have had their voice recorded. George Edward Gouraud recorded him on behalf of Thomas Edison on the evening of 5 October 1888 at his home in Upper Sydenham near Crystal Palace, London.

Family
Raikes married Charlotte Blanche, of Plas Teg, Mold, daughter of Charles Blayney Trevor-Roper, on 26 September 1861. They had several children, including Cecil Dacre Staveley Raikes (1874–1947), a Vice-Admiral in the Royal Navy, and Henry St John Digby Raikes, father of the Conservative politician Sir Victor Raikes. The family lived at Llwynegrin Hall, Wales. Raikes died on 24 August 1891, aged 52. Charlotte Raikes survived her husband by over 30 years and died in September 1922.

References

External links
 
 
 

1838 births
1891 deaths
Presidents of the Cambridge Union
Conservative Party (UK) MPs for English constituencies
Members of the Parliament of the United Kingdom for the University of Cambridge
United Kingdom Postmasters General
People educated at Shrewsbury School
UK MPs 1868–1874
UK MPs 1874–1880
UK MPs 1880–1885
UK MPs 1885–1886
UK MPs 1886–1892
Members of the Privy Council of the United Kingdom